#Twice3 (Hashtag Twice3) is the third Japanese compilation album released by South Korean girl group Twice. The album consists of Japanese and Korean versions of "Fancy", "Feel Special", "More & More", "Stuck In My Head", "21:29" and "The Best Thing I Ever Did". It was released on September 16, 2020, under Warner Music Japan.

Background and release 
Following the commercial success of Twice's Japanese single "Fanfare", JYP Entertainment released the cover image for #Twice3 on July 17, 2020, at 12AM KST, and confirmed in an official statement that the Japanese compilation album was set to be released on September 16. 12 tracks were confirmed to be featured in the album, including the Japanese versions of "The Best Thing I Ever Did", "Fancy" (2019), "Feel Special" (2019) and "More & More" (2020).

The pre-release track "Stuck In My Head" was released on September 2. The compilation album was officially released on September 16.

Commercial performance 
Following its release, #Twice3 debuted atop the daily album charts for both Oricon and Tower Records, selling 67,808 copies on Oricon in the first day. The album's pre-release track, "Stuck In My Head", also topped the weekly Top 100 chart run by Line Music after its release on September 2. #Twice3 would then top the Oricon Weekly Albums chart on September 22, 2020, with sales of over 109,000 copies, becoming the group's seventh album to top the Oricon Albums Chart and making Twice the second foreign female artist to achieve the feat, following South Korean singer BoA.

Track listing

Charts

Weekly charts

Year-end charts

Certifications

References 

Twice (group) albums
Warner Music Japan compilation albums
2020 compilation albums
Japanese-language compilation albums